The Statue of Queen Anne in Minehead, Somerset, England was built in 1719. It is a Grade II* listed building.

History

The statue depicts Queen Anne in full court dress. It was designed by Francis Bird, who had previously made a sculpture of the queen for St Paul's Cathedral,  after a commission by Sir Jacob Bancks the local member of parliament for Minehead. Statues of the queen were a "fashionable ornament" during her reign.

It was removed from its original site in St Michael's Church during restoration work in 1880. It was to have been placed in the town hall, but following a public subscription for the canopy it was re-erected at its current site in 1893.

Architecture

The statue is made of alabaster. The pedestal and canopy which were added by H. Dare Bryan in 1893 are of Carrara marble. Above the statue is a dentilled pediment and cornice

References

External links

 

1719 sculptures
Arts in Somerset
Grade II* listed buildings in West Somerset
Grade II* listed monuments and memorials
Minehead
Monuments and memorials in Somerset
Monuments and memorials to Anne, Queen of Great Britain
Outdoor sculptures in England
Statues in England